Johnny Desmond (born Giovanni Alfredo De Simone; November 14, 1919 – September 6, 1985) was an American singer who was popular in the 1940s, 1950s and 1960s.

Biography

Early years
Desmond was born Giovanni de Simone in Detroit, Michigan, United States. He began singing in the St. Joseph's parish choir when he was 11 years old. As a boy he also sang on a local radio station, but at age 15 he quit to work at his father's grocery. He attended Northwestern High School. He retained a love of music, and briefly attended the Detroit Conservatory of Music before heading to the nightclub circuit, playing piano and singing.

In 1939, he formed his own singing group. The group was first called the Downbeats. After being hired to work with Bob Crosby's big band in 1940, it was renamed the Bob-O-Links. The group appeared on 15 commercial recordings by the Crosby orchestra, including two charted hits, "You Forgot About Me" (which reached No. 15), and "Do You Care?" (No. 18).

War years
In the middle of 1941, Desmond decided to leave the Bob-O-Links to go solo. He became the featured vocalist for Gene Krupa's band, replacing Howard Dulaney, in September, recording over a dozen songs, the last of which was "All Those Wonderful Years", a song from the movie Keep 'em Flying, which reached No. 21 on the US chart.

In 1942, he enlisted in the United States Army, but his military service was in fact a continuation of his singing career. He was a member of Glenn Miller's Army Air Forces Orchestra and replaced singer Tony Martin after he joined the US Navy, from November 1943 until July 28, 1945, when the band was shipped home. He and the band played troop and air bases in England, and eventually went to France in December 1944. He made a number of radio broadcasts with the Miller band, and was given his own show called "A Soldier and a Song." on the American Forces Network (and sometimes on BBC Radio). His discharge took place on November 23, 1945.

Postwar era
Immediately after his discharge, Desmond became the singer and master of ceremonies on the Teentimers Club, a Saturday morning program on NBC radio.

After the war he took a job on The Breakfast Club, a radio variety program in Chicago, Illinois. He made a number of charted hit recordings: "Don't You Remember Me?" (recorded 1946, reaching No. 21 on the charts), "Guilty" (recorded December 6, 1946, reaching No. 12), "C'est si bon" (recorded May 11, 1949, reaching No. 25), "Don't Cry, Joe" (recorded May 21, 1949, reaching No. 22), "Just Say I Love Her" (recorded January 20, 1950, reaching No. 24), "The Picnic Song" (recorded April 1, 1950, reaching No. 20), "Because of You" (recorded February 10, 1951, reaching No. 17), and "Woman" (recorded September 15, 1953, reaching No. 9). On September 24, 1953, he joined with Don Cornell and Alan Dale to record "(The Gang that Sang) Heart of My Heart,"  a No. 10 hit on the chart. During this time he switched recording companies frequently. The 1946 recordings were made for RCA Victor, the 1949-51 recordings for MGM, and the 1953 recordings for Coral Records.

In the 1940s and 1950s, many artists would record the same song at about the same time, and some chart hits for Desmond were also major hits for other singers. Thus "Guilty" (No. 12 for Desmond) was an even bigger hit for Margaret Whiting, with a No. 4 position. "Because of You" (No. 17 for Desmond) was a No. 1 hit for Tony Bennett. "The High and the Mighty" (No. 17 for Desmond) was No. 4 for Les Baxter and his Orchestra.  The Desmond/Dale/Cornell version of "Heart of My Heart" reached No. 10, but the Four Aces' version peaked at No. 7 on the chart. In some cases, Desmond's version was the biggest hit. Teresa Brewer also recorded "The Picnic Song" but her version did not chart. "Woman" was recorded by José Ferrer (back to back with a recording of "Man" by his wife, Rosemary Clooney), but Desmond's was the bigger version in the US (though the UK Singles Chart favored the Ferrer recording). Desmond also recorded several versions of songs that did not chart but became hits for other singers: for example, "Mister and Mississippi" (a hit for Patti Page) and "Too Young" (a hit for Nat King Cole).

Desmond was a guest on the early television series, Faye Emerson's Wonderful Town, which aired on CBS from 1951 to 1952. In 1957, Desmond joined Boris Karloff in a guest appearance on NBC's The Gisele MacKenzie Show.

A pair of 1957 films from Columbia Pictures cast Desmond in starring roles, the musical Calypso Heat Wave and the crime drama Escape from San Quentin, as did a 1958 adventure film, Desert Hell.

In 1961, Desmond co-starred on the CBS summer replacement series Glenn Miller Time, which featured the Miller orchestra under the direction of host Ray McKinley.

Later years
On Broadway, Desmond appeared in Say, Darling (1958) and as Nick Arnstein in Funny Girl, after Sydney Chaplin left the cast.

Personal life and death 
Desmond married singer Ruth Keddington.

In September 1985, he died of cancer at Cedars-Sinai Medical Center in Los Angeles, California, at the age of 65.

Singles

References

External links
Susan Liddell's Johnny Desmond Fan site
Article on Desmond on The Interlude Era website
 Johnny Desmond recordings at the Discography of American Historical Recordings.

1919 births
1985 deaths
American people of Italian descent
Big band singers
Carlton Records artists
Traditional pop music singers
20th-century American singers
Singers from Detroit
20th-century American male singers
American male jazz musicians
United States Army personnel of World War II